Chen Hao (born 11 February 1954) is a Chinese politician. He served as Governor of Yunnan province from 2014 to 2016 and also Communist Party Secretary of Yunnan from 2016 to 2020. He was formerly Governor of Yunnan and vice-chairman of the All-China Federation of Trade Unions.

Career
Chen Hao was born February 1954 in Haimen, Jiangsu province, and worked as a schoolteacher in Haimen from 1973 to 1977. He joined the Communist Party of China in June 1976.

From 1979 to 1983 he worked at a fruit company in Jing'an District, Shanghai. From 1980 to 1984 he studied at Jiang'an Part-time University, majoring in Chinese literature. Starting in 1983, he worked at the Jiang'an District government, becoming Deputy Communist Party Chief of the district in 1996. From 1989 to 1991 he enrolled at the graduate school of East China Normal University, studying economics.

In 1997, he entered the municipal government of Shanghai. In 2003, he obtained an MBA degree from China Europe International Business School. From 2003 to 2010 he served as vice-chairman of the Shanghai Municipal People's Congress, and chairman of the Shanghai General Trade Union. In 2011 he became vice-chairman of the All-China Federation of Trade Unions.

On 17 October 2014, Chen Hao was appointed acting Governor of Yunnan province, succeeding Li Jiheng. He was confirmed as governor in January 2015. In August 2016, Chen was appointed the Communist Party Secretary of Yunnan by the CPC Central Committee.

In December 2020, Chen was appointed as the Deputy Chairperson of the National People's Congress Ethnic Affairs Committee.

References

Living people
1954 births
Governors of Yunnan
Chinese Communist Party politicians from Jiangsu
People's Republic of China politicians from Jiangsu
Politicians from Nantong
East China Normal University alumni
People from Haimen
Political office-holders in Shanghai
All-China Federation of Trade Unions
China Europe International Business School alumni
Members of the 19th Central Committee of the Chinese Communist Party
Members of the Standing Committee of the 12th National People's Congress